John Theophil Strentzel (29 November 1813 – 31 October 1890) was a Polish-born physician who gained fame as a pioneer in the area of experimental California horticulture. He is best known as the father-in-law of writer and environmental activist John Muir.

Biography
Born in Lublin, Poland into a wealthy family, Strentzel was forced into exile after his participation in the Polish revolution of 1830. To avoid being inducted into the Russian army, he and his brother Henry emigrated to the United States of America, settling in Texas in 1840. It was there, in 1843, that he married his wife, Louisiana Erwin. In 1849 he made his way out west to California, eventually settling in the state's central valley, along the Tuolumne river, near the LaGrange mining camp, where he established a ferry, hotel and general store before moving on to the Merced River area. Illness and flooding of his home along that river forced him to move again. His wife Louisiana's health was poor and the family decided to move to California, first to Benicia, the first capital of California.  There they found a neighbor they had known in Texas, who recommended they move to Martinez where they settled in the Alhambra Valley, "a lovely fertile valley protected by high hills, from the cold winds and fogs of San Francisco"  located just south of the city of Martinez, California.  He purchased twenty acres and set about establishing a long-dreamed of horticultural business.

Strentzel was one of the first scientific horticulturists of the fruit-growing state, and his ranch produced and shipped hundreds of tons of fruit annually. Years later, Strenzel was recognized as a foremost expert on California's budding horticultural industry.

In 1880, Strentzel's good friend and companion, John Muir, married Strentzel's daughter, Louisa. He allowed the earliest form of the Martinez Library to use one of his buildings with no charge. In 1882, Dr. Strentzel constructed a 10,000 square foot home on a knoll above his vast orchards; John and Louisa Muir moved into the home after Dr. Strentzel's death in October 1890, and it is now preserved by the National Park Service as the John Muir National Historic Site.

Strentzel is buried in a small, private cemetery, along with other family members (including John Muir). The cemetery, now owned by the National Park Service, is located near the family's Alhambra Valley home.

Notes

Polish emigrants to the United States
1813 births
1890 deaths
People from Lublin
Physicians from California